The 1961 Cleveland Browns season was the team's 12th season with the National Football League.

Offseason 
On March 22, Dave R. Jones sold the Browns to a group headed by Arthur B. Modell

Exhibition schedule

Regular season schedule

Standings

Awards and records 
 Jim Brown, NFL rushing leader, 1,408 yards
 Milt Plum, NFL leader, passing yards, (2416)

Milestones 
 Jim Brown, Fourth Consecutive 1,000 yard season
 Jim Brown, Fifth Consecutive Rushing Title

Personnel

Roster

Staff/Coaches

References

External links 
 1961 Cleveland Browns Statistics at jt-sw.com
 1961 Cleveland Browns Schedule at jt-sw.com
 1961 Cleveland Browns at DatabaseFootball.com  

Cleveland
Cleveland Browns seasons
Cleveland